Mansfield-et-Pontefract is a municipality in the Pontiac Regional County Municipality of western Quebec, Canada. It is located on the Ottawa River, northwest of Gatineau. It is the most populated municipality in the Pontiac Regional County Municipality, with most of the population and businesses concentrated along Quebec Route 148.

It is home to the main tourist attractions of the Pontiac region: the Chutes Coulonge, the George Bryson House, and the Félix-Gabriel-Marchand Bridge.

Communities
Davidson
Dépôt Davidson
Devonshire Park
Jim Lake
Leclair
Mansfield

History
In 1849, the Mansfield Township was formed that was incorporated as a township municipality in 1855. It may have been named after an English town in Nottinghamshire or in honour of Sir James Mansfield (1733-1821), Solicitor General of Canada in 1780, or William Murray, 1st Earl of Mansfield (1705–1793). In 1863, Pontefract Township was officially established, named after an English town in Yorkshire.

On January 1, 1868, the townships were merged to form the United Township Municipality of Mansfield-et-Pontefract. In 1888, a portion of its territory separated and was incorporated as the Village Municipality of Fort-Coulonge. In 2003, Mansfield-et-Pontefract changed its status from united township municipality to an ordinary municipality.

Demographics

Population

Language
Mother tongue (2021):
 English as first language: 17.8%
 French as first language: 77.6%
 English and French as first language: 4.1%
 Other as first language: 0.5%

See also
 List of municipalities in Quebec

References

External links

 Official site
 Chutes Coulonges

Municipalities in Quebec
Incorporated places in Outaouais